A total solar eclipse will occur on July 13, 2037. A solar eclipse occurs when the Moon passes between Earth and the Sun, thereby totally or partly obscuring the image of the Sun for a viewer on Earth. A total solar eclipse occurs when the Moon's apparent diameter is larger than the Sun's, blocking all direct sunlight, turning day into darkness. Totality occurs in a narrow path across Earth's surface, with the partial solar eclipse visible over a surrounding region thousands of kilometres wide. Totality will pass through the centre of Brisbane and the Gold Coast.

Images 
Animated path

Related eclipses

Solar eclipses of 2036–2039

Saros 127

Metonic series 
 All eclipses in this table occur at the Moon's ascending node.

References

External links 
 NASA graphics

2037 07 13
2037 in science
2037 07 13
2037 07 13